Pseudophilautus wynaadensis, commonly known as the Wayanad bush frog, common bush frog, jerdon's bush frog, plain-colored bush frog, Malabar coast frog, or dark-eared bush frog, is a species of frog in the family Rhacophoridae. It is endemic to the Western Ghats of southwest India.

Description

Pseudophilautus wynaadensis males measure  in snout–vent length; a female measured  SVL. The body is rather slender. Colouration varies, even within the same population, from uniform grey to brownish or reddish grey. The upper two-thirds of the tympanum is dark black. The dorsum has spinular projections.

Distribution 
It is found widely in southern Western Ghats from the regions of Coorg and Wayanad to Periyar, on both sides of the Palakkad Gap.

Habitat
Pseudophilautus wynaadensis is associated with the understorey of tropical moist evergreen forest and shrubland, as well as secondary forest and cultivated land (such as tea and coffee plantations). It is among the most common bush frogs in the area, and a dominant one in wayside vegetation and urban areas. It is nocturnal and arboreal.

References

External links

wynaadensis
Frogs of India
Endemic fauna of the Western Ghats
Amphibians described in 1853
Taxa named by Thomas C. Jerdon
Taxonomy articles created by Polbot